George Addison may refer to:
 George Augustus Addison (1792–1814), author
 George Henry Male Addison (1857–1922), Australian architect
 George William Addison (1849–1937), English soldier and footballer